Chinese balloon may refer to:

 Sky lantern, small hot-air balloon launched for festivities, historically also used for communication and militarily
 2023 Chinese balloon incident, a high-altitude balloon discovered floating above North America, subsequently shot down by the U.S. military
 2023 Chinese balloon over Costa Rica, Colombia, Venezuela; see List of high-altitude object events in 2023

See also

 Balloon (2019 film), a Chinese film
 Balloon (disambiguation)